Miguel Porlán Noguera (born 12 October 1961), known as Chendo, is a Spanish former footballer who played as a right-back. He spent his entire professional career with Real Madrid, making 497 official appearances and winning several titles.

Chendo was a member of the Spain national team, being selected for two World Cups.

Club career
Born in Totana, Region of Murcia, Chendo played professionally with Real Madrid for 17 seasons, winning seven La Liga titles, two Copa del Rey trophies, one UEFA Champions League, and back-to-back UEFA Cups. He arrived at the club at the age of 15 and was part of its junior ranks for five years, making his debut for the first team on 11 April 1982 in a 2–1 win at CD Castellón.

He got his opportunity at the starter position at the beginning of 1983–84, when Juan José, who dominated the right-back position, was injured. When Juan José returned to the first team, Chendo returned to the bench, but finished the season again as first-choice, making 26 competitive appearances.

Chendo became the starter in his fourth year, playing 25 league matches and adding 11 in European competition. At the end of the season, Real won the UEFA Cup against Hungarian club Fehérvár FC by a 3–1 aggregate score, and conquered the Copa de la Liga with a 4–3 aggregate victory over Atlético Madrid, with the player starting in both finals; the team finished fifth in the league, 17 points behind champions FC Barcelona.

For the next eight seasons, Chendo was the undisputed starter of a squad that collected five straight league titles. From 1992 to 1995, however, he would only make 34 league appearances, losing his place to Nando, Luis Enrique, and Paco Llorente. Though he took part in 23 games in the 1995–96 campaign, he played second-fiddle to Quique Sánchez Flores, Carlos Secretário and Christian Panucci. Like Manolo Sanchís later, he was a moral supporter and a bench captain, subbing rarely and starting even more rarely.

After Real Madrid lifted their seventh European Cup against Juventus F.C. on 20 May 1998 (he did not play in the decisive match), Chendo retired from professional football, aged almost 37. He immediately started working with the club as a match delegate, occupying that position for well over two decades.

International career
Chendo earned 26 caps for Spain, and played in the 1986 and 1990 FIFA World Cups. Backing up Atlético Madrid's Tomás in the former and starting in the latter, he totalled five appearances.

Chendo's debut came on 22 January 1986, in a friendly with the Soviet Union in Las Palmas.

Personal life
On 2 July 1986, the 24-year-old Chendo was involved in a car accident near Quintanar de la Orden. He and his wife emerged unscathed, but their one-month old son Miguel died.

Career statistics

Honours
Real Madrid
La Liga: 1985–86, 1986–87, 1987–88, 1988–89, 1989–90, 1994–95, 1996–97
Copa del Rey: 1988–89, 1992–93
Copa de la Liga: 1985
Supercopa de España: 1988, 1989, 1990, 1993, 1997
UEFA Champions League: 1997–98
UEFA Cup: 1984–85, 1985–86
Copa Iberoamericana: 1994

See also
List of one-club men

References

External links

1961 births
Living people
People from Totana
Spanish footballers
Footballers from the Region of Murcia
Association football defenders
La Liga players
Segunda División players
Real Madrid Castilla footballers
Real Madrid CF players
UEFA Champions League winning players
UEFA Cup winning players
Spain youth international footballers
Spain under-21 international footballers
Spain international footballers
1986 FIFA World Cup players
1990 FIFA World Cup players
Real Madrid CF non-playing staff